Rusiec  is a village in the administrative district of Gmina Wapno, within Wągrowiec County, Greater Poland Voivodeship, in west-central Poland.

The village has a population of 190.

References

Rusiec